Alexandros Charles Michalos  (born August 1, 1935) is a Canadian political scientist and philosopher known for his work in quality of life research. He is professor emeritus of political science and former chancellor at the University of Northern British Columbia, where he served as the founding director of the Institute for Social Research and Evaluation. Before joining the University of Northern British Columbia, he taught at the University of Guelph from 1966 to 1994. He served as senior research advisor to the Canadian Index of Wellbeing, and continues to serve as a member of their Canadian Research Advisory Group. He served as president of the International Society for Quality-of-Life Studies from 1999 to 2000. He is the founder or co-founder of seven peer-reviewed academic journals, and as of 2010, still served as editor-in-chief of one of them: the Journal of Business Ethics. He was named a member of the Order of Canada in 2010.

References

Members of the Order of Canada
1935 births
Living people
Canadian political scientists
20th-century Canadian philosophers
University of Chicago alumni
Academic staff of the University of Guelph
Academic staff of the University of Northern British Columbia
Academic journal editors
Case Western Reserve University alumni